Wonder.land is a musical with music by Damon Albarn and lyrics and book by Moira Buffini. Inspired by Lewis Carroll's novels Alice's Adventures in Wonderland (1865) and Through the Looking-Glass (1871), the musical made its world premiere at the Palace Theatre, Manchester, in July 2015 as part of the Manchester International Festival. The musical transferred to London's Royal National Theatre from November 2015, before opening at the Théâtre du Châtelet, Paris, in 2016.Background
The musical is inspired by the novels Alice in Wonderland and Through the Looking-Glass, written by Lewis Carroll. On 21 January 2015, the musical was officially confirmed and it was announced that the show would premiere in July 2015, as part of the Manchester International Festival, with tickets going on sale the following day. The musical, which is a co-production between the Manchester International Festival, the Royal National Theatre and the Théâtre du Châtelet, Paris, marks the 150th anniversary of the release of Alice's adventures in Wonderland.

The idea for a musical based on Alice in Wonderland came from the artistic director of the Manchester International Festival, Alex Poots.

Damon Albarn previously collaborated with the festival on Monkey: Journey to the West and Dr Dee.

The musical has a book by Moira Buffini and is directed by Rufus Norris, with set design by Rae Smith, costume design by Katrina Lindsay, lighting design by Paule Constable, projections by 59 Productions and choreography by Javier De Frutos. The musical's score is composed by Damon Albarn, with lyrics by Moira Buffini, sound design by Paul Arditti and musical direction by David Shrubsole.

Production history
The show's premiere production  began previews at the Palace Theatre, Manchester on 29 June 2015, with its official opening night on 2 July, for a limited run until 12 July. Following its premiere, the musical transferred in a heavily revised version at the National theatre, where it ran at their Olivier Theatre from 27 November 2015 to 30 April 2016. The premiere production stopped at Theatre Du Chatelet in Paris, France, for a limited run from 7 to 16 June 2016.

 Synopsis (National Theatre and onwards)
NOTE: This synopsis is based on the completed, final version as seen at The National Theatre and onwards. It does not describe the Manchester World premiere version, which was significantly different in songs and some of the plot.

 Act 1 
The play opens with the AI known as MC, who telling us about virtual technology and how it is used as "a portal to boundless lands" ("Prologue"). We are then introduced to teenager Aly. Her mother Bianca is exasperated with her as she has spent the entire weekend inside and on her phone. After some forceful persuading, Aly reluctantly follows her mom into the town and to the supermarket. Aly thinks that her life is being ruined by her parents and reflects on this whilst in the supermarket ("Who's Ruining Your Life?")

Aly's alcoholic father Matt is also in the supermarket and on meeting each other again, he and Bianca argue over their messy divorce and Matt's former gambling habits. Aly goes home, and fed up with everything, picks up her phone. Seeking solace online, she tries to engage with a few people from school, but is left with her self-confidence in tatters after they bully her ("Network"). Aly begins to wish that she is someone else entirely so she wouldn't have to deal with her parents' divorce or school bullies.

After pasting "Be someone else" in a search engine, Aly comes across the virtual online game called Wonder.land. Led by the MC, she is enticed into this strange virtual world and creates an avatar for herself, the beautiful and kind Alice ("Wonder.land"). There is only one rule in Wonder.land; extreme malice will result in deletion from the game. With her new identity complete, Aly and Alice befriend each other and encounter the Cheshire Cat, who explains that you can be anyone you want to be here ("Fabulous"). Fascinated, Aly decides to go on a quest and Alice follows the white rabbit down a rabbit hole, falling past various unusual objects and musical notes ("Falling").

The next morning Aly is too distracted by Wonder.land on her phone to listen to her mum's complaints about her baby brother Charlie. At school Aly plays Wonder.land on her phone through the corridors but it is confiscated by Ms Manxome, the school headmistress. In a school assembly, she laments about phone usage and tells the children that taking their pleasures from them is for their own good. ("I'm Right")

During a break, Aly goes to Ms Manxome's office to retrieve her phone. Ms Manxome hands it back but gives her a warning - if she catches her with it again "it's a beheading- I mean detention." In class Aly meets up with the three girls who bullied her online. They say they want to be friends but only if Aly says sorry. They begin to bully her again until the math teacher, Mr King, enters. Aly's friend Luke walks in late yet again and is given a detention. Still hurt by the girls' comments, Aly goes on her phone in class and takes her frustration and sadness out on Alice. Alice cries a massive pool of tears but is interrupted by Dum and Dee, two fat twins fighting with each other ("Freaks"). Alice goes to try and befriend them but her attempts backfire and they begin to insult her. Aly decides to take action and makes Alice fight them. Dum and Dee cry and Aly and Alice spot a gigantic mouse coming towards them. The mouse likes Alice's fighting and introduces himself. They are soon joined by other players, the Dodo, the Mock Turtle and Humpty, who each have problems in their lives. The Dodo is stressed because his Eco-obsessed parents want him to save the planet, Dum and Dee are dancers but hate the pressure it puts them under, Humpty has problems with her parents, the Mock Turtle has no self-esteem and hates her avatar, and the mouse is lustful.  Wonderland is a place to hide for them all, taking away the pressures of teenage life ("Crap Life").

Aly snaps back to reality when Mr King asks her a math question and she is unable to answer. Given detention, Aly walks out of class with everyone else. Confronting the three bullies, Aly makes fun of one of them for having facial hair and she runs into the bathroom to hide from them. Getting out her phone, she immerses herself in Wonder.land again, where Alice meets a strange Caterpillar who is obsessed with identity ("Who are You?"). Aly realizes she has no clue who she really is. She is interrupted by the three girls who proceed to taunt her about her father's gambling addiction and poverty, then beat her up and leave. Alone and with her confidence at a new low, Aly seeks understanding in Alice, who is innocently still singing the Caterpillar's song. Alice is distraught at her friend's sadness and tries to get her to tell her what is wrong. Aly doesn't want to but Alice then reminds her that as an avatar, she isn't real. Aly is only admitting things to herself. Aly tells Alice her secrets about her family and how she hates her life, and is surprised that Alice has similar problems too, despite how liked and kind she is. ("Secrets")

Luke comes into the girls' toilets, terrified as he is being threatened with violence by Kieran. Luke hides in a cubicle whilst Kieran enters. Aly defends Luke and manages to make Kieran leave. Luke reveals that the reason why Kieran hates him is because, like himself, he is gay. Aly is amazed. The friends decide to skip class and sit and play their games on their smartphones. Luke plays Zombie Swarm, whilst Aly plays Wonder.land. Ms Manxome suddenly enters the toilets. Luke hides his phone but Aly fails to. Ms Manxome confiscates the phone for three months and Aly and Luke quickly exit. Alone, Ms Manxome finds that Aly hasn't locked her phone screen and that Alice is calling her. Ms Manxome begins to talk to her and Alice thinks she is still talking to Aly.

Meanwhile, Aly laments her phone being taken away from her to Luke. Aly's father Matt arrives and decides to take them out to tea to celebrate. He has a new career at the local garden centre ("In Clover.") However once at the tea shop things quickly begin to go wrong as her father's manic tendencies result in him dancing on the tables and playing with spoons on the table. When asked to stop he punches one of the waiters. Aly's mother Bianca arrives and the two begin to argue yet again. Aly is a still point in utter chaos and begins to notice that Wonder.land is invading reality as the MC emerges from a gigantic teapot and the landscape outside becomes surreally strange. ("Chances")

 Act 2 
Ms Manxome manipulates Alice around the gaming segment of Wonder.land on Aly's phone. Overjoyed, Ms Manxome immediately buys 3 pet playing cards, red accessories and a red dress for Alice. She changes Alice's hair to red. By the end of the gaming session, Alice is entirely under Ms Manxome's control. ("Entre Act") In the social side of Wonder.land, Ms Manxome meets with Alice and reveals her plans- to dominate and destroy the online world. Alice still thinks she is talking to Aly and so thinks nothing of this. Ms Manxome sings of the beauty "her" avatar exudes and wallows in self-absorption. ("Me")

Meanwhile, Aly, her father Matt, her Mother Bianca and baby Charlie are at the police station. PC Rook tries to get Matt to take a statement as he is charged with assault and affray, but her attempts prove fruitless as Matt and Bianca argue again. Aly laments the loss of her family's unity. ("Heartless Useless")

In Wonder.land, Ms Manxome is stunned when she meets Alice's avatar friends, Dum and Dee, the Mock Turtle, the Dodo, Humpty and the Mouse. Alice happily introduces them to her but Ms Manxome hates them. Telling Alice that they are "a rabble", Ms Manxome makes her chase them away, but Alice and Ms Manxome are driven away by Alice's friends, who are worried about the change in her. Is someone else controlling her? ("Me (Reprise)")

At home Bianca discovers that Aly missed a detention and had her phone confiscated. Aly makes a pitiful excuse and Bianca worries that she is losing Aly to technology. She bans the internet. ("Gadget") Charlie vomits on the floor and Aly is left to clean it up, sarcastically singing about her brother. She goes out into the city, looking for an internet cafe so she can go to Wonder.land, the only place where she is truly happy. ("Everyone Loves Charlie")

At the internet cafe, Aly is alarmed when she cannot log into Wonder.land and her avatar appears to be already in use. Aly watches as Alice is given a Vorpal sword, brought by Ms Manxome with the money on Aly's phone. Under Ms Manxome's control, Alice is no longer Alice, but "The Red Queen" a powerful and forceful monarch. Ms Manxome tells Alice to kill her friends. Alice is alarmed at this idea and her illusion is shattered- she now knows the person controlling her is no longer Aly. Despite this, Alice cannot rebel and under Ms Manxome's control, lashes out on her friends, bullying and attempting to hurt them. Ms Manxome is delighted and laughs at this in glee. The MC warns that Alice has a deletion warning- any more malice and she will be deleted. Both Aly and Alice are distraught. Alice is acting as if under possession and Aly now knows that Ms Manxome has seized control of her phone and avatar. ("O Children")

After being told that the internet cafe will close, Aly comes up with the idea of having her friend Luke help with the problem. Aly contacts Luke through his Zombie Swarm game and tells him her problem. Aly decides to break into Ms Manxome's office to try and retrieve the phone and thus un-corrupt Alice. Luke agrees to meet her at the school gates.

In his cell, Matt thinks over his and Bianca's problems, and wonders if they should put it behind them. At home, Bianca has the same thoughts. ("Man of Broken Glass") At the school gates Luke lectures Aly for not thinking her plan through. He is worried that she will do something stupid. Aly decides to break into the office anyway, leaving Luke outside the gates. Luke contacts the three girls who bullied Aly and tells them about Ms Manxome playing on Aly's stolen phone. They all decide to put the news out online so everyone will know it's not Aly. ("Fabulous (Reprise)")

Bianca goes to the police station as she has now realized that Aly has gone missing, Bianca takes her smartphone out and gives it to Matt. If Aly is anywhere, she's likely to also be online and in Wonder.land. In Wonder.land, the avatars prepare for war against Alice as controlled by Ms Manxome, but they cannot agree on a strategy. In the police station, Matt hacks into Wonder.land and sees Aly's avatar Alice, but quickly realizes that she's being controlled by someone other than Aly. The White Rabbit appears, her old self for a brief second, Alice is delighted. He's going to lead her into more adventures after all. But Ms Manxome becomes violent, making Alice push him out the way.

Reality and Wonder.land begin to melt into each other. Aly is now in Ms Manxome's office and grabs the phone off her when she isn't looking. They begin to fight over the phone. In Wonder.land, Alice fights between her real self and the Red Queen persona. The avatars are confused. Has Alice gone insane? In her confusion, Alice wields the vorpal sword and slices the head of the White Rabbit off. The MC declares that for two acts of extreme malice, Alice will be deleted. Aly and Alice are horrified and try to explain that Alice was hijacked but it is too late. Aly and Alice try to explain that they are the real Alice. Ms Manxome grabs the phone again and the fight resumes.

As Aly and Ms Manxome fight, Matt and Bianca realize that Aly is in Ms Manxome's office and drive to come and fetch her. Online, the three girls and Luke watch. Luke comes into Wonder.land and hacks the game to include zombies from Zombie swarm. Ms Manxome makes Alice fight them off. Suddenly Ms Manxome has Aly in the guillotine in her office and is about to behead her. Alice aims the vorpal sword at Luke, but then innocently kisses him in confusion. Luke is appalled. Ms Manxome makes Alice kill Luke and flinching, Alice does. "(Who is Alice?") Horrified at what she has done, Alice fights off the Red Queen persona through glitching. Alice will be deleted in seconds, just before she is able to reveal that her quest was to help Aly understand who she was. Aly thanks her, and bids goodbye to her friend. Alice disappears.

Wonder.land and reality finally part ways as in Ms Manxome's office everything settles back. Aly is reunited with Matt and Bianca. Luke has been livestreaming Ms Manxome on his phone to use as evidence. As far as Ms Manxome is concerned, she has done nothing wrong. But by breaking into the school, Aly and Luke will be expelled. Ms Manxome tells Aly that she will go to a juvenile detention centre for this. Matt finds Aly's phone and reminds Ms Manxome that she spent Aly's money on purchases for Wonder.land with it. PC Rook hears of this and declares that she'll have to take Ms Manxome down to the station with her. Ms Manxome thinks it is fine, after all, she's never wrong! ("I'm Right (Reprise)") As Ms Manxome is driven away by the police, Aly finds a renewed sense of self, she is Alice unshakably. Alice still lives in Aly's  memory, and if Aly listens close enough, its almost like she can hear her. ("Secrets (Reprise)")

Several months later, and as Aly goes online she finds her old friends in Wonder.land want her back. She decides not to go back, because she knows who she is now and has a new interest in her family. She might visit every now and then, but not spend all of her time there. The Company and MC reflect on the wonders of the Internet and the show draws to a close. ("Wonder.land (Reprise)")

 Music (National Theatre version and onwards) 
 Act 1                                                                                     
 "Prologue" - MC
 "Who's Ruining Your Life?" - Aly, Bianca, Matt and Company
 "Network" - Aly, Kitty, Dinah, Mary-Ann
 "Wonder.land" - MC, Aly and Company
 "Fabulous" - Cheshire Cat, Aly, Alice and Company
 "Falling" - Aly, Alice, MC and Company
 "I'm Right" - Ms Manxome, Aly, Luke and Company
 "Crap Life" - Aly, Alice, Dum, Dee, Mouse, Mock Turtle, Humpty, Dodo
 "Who are You?" - Caterpillar and Company
 "Secrets"- Aly, Alice
 "In Clover" - Matt
 "Chances" - Matt, Aly, Luke and Company

 Act 2 
 "Entre Act" - Orchestra
 "Me" - Ms Manxome, Alice
 "Heartless Useless" - Bianca, Matt, PC Rook, Aly
 "Me (Reprise)"- Ms Manxome, Alice, Mouse, Dum, Dee, Mock Turtle, Dodo, Humpty
 "Gadget" - Bianca, Aly
 "Everyone Loves Charlie" - Aly, Matt, Bianca and Company
 "O Children" - Ms Manxome, Alice, Aly
 " Man of Broken Glass" - Matt, Bianca
 "Fabulous (Reprise)" - MC
 "Who is Alice?" -   MC, Ms Manxome, Alice, Aly, Kitty, Dinah, Mary-Ann, Matt, Bianca, and Company
 "I'm Right (Reprise") - Ms Manxome, PC Rook, Aly, Bianca, Matt, Luke and Company
 "Secrets (Reprise) - Aly, Alice
 "Wonder.land (Reprise)" - MC, Aly, Luke, Bianca and Company

 Principal roles and cast members 

 Critical reception Wonder.land received mixed reviews in its Manchester premiere, many praising the projections by 59 productions, and the actors, but criticising the narrative and music.

A re-tooled, re-written version of the show opened at the National Theatre in London on 23 November 2015, where it received largely negative reviews.

The production stopped at the Theatre du chatelet in Paris, France, on 6 June 2016. The show was extremely well received by most French critics, gaining mostly positive reviews.

 Beyond the Rabbit Hole: Wonder.land at the National Theatre (Vodafone presents) 
Sponsored by Vodafone, Down the Rabbit Hole was a questions and answers session with the Wonder.land creative team Moira Buffini, Damon Albarn and Ruffus Norris, which also included various acoustic performances by the National Theatre cast. The event was filmed and then posted on the Vodafone website and YouTube. The acoustic sessions are notable for using some songs ("Prologue" and "Gadget") that do not appear in the cast recording, and also for using understudy Abigail Rose as Alice instead of Carly Bawden, as she was not available at the time.

The songs performed are as follows:
 Prologue- Hal Fowler
 Gadget- Lois Chimimba and Golda Roushuvel
 Secrets- Abigail Rose and Lois Chimimba
 Man of Broken Glass- Damon Albarn and Golda Roshuvel
 Fabulous- Hal Fowler, Lois Chimimba and Abigail Rose

SoundtrackSongs from wonder.land'' is the soundtrack to the musical and was first released on 15 April 2016. The soundtrack is performed by the National Theatre cast and also features two songs not in the musical, "Japanese Duchess" and "Alice Saw".

Track listing

References

External links

MIF World premiere production site
National Theatre production site
Theatre Du Châtelet production site

2015 musicals
Musicals based on novels
British musicals
Works based on Alice in Wonderland
Damon Albarn
Virtual reality in fiction
Works about video games
Works about mobile phones
Works about the Internet